ANZCA may refer to:
 Australian and New Zealand College of Anaesthetists
 Australian and New Zealand Cultural Arts